Mykhailo Kaskevych (b. 17 February 1948, Nizhyn — d. 20 July 2004, Kyiv) was a Ukrainian politician and economist.

Biography
Mykhailo Kaskevych was born in 1948 in Nizhyn, Chernihiv Oblast, Ukrainian SSR. After graduating from Kyiv National Economic University in 1973 started a career in public service. Held multiple positions with Ukrainian SSR governing bodies — DerzhPlan and Council of Ministers.

Weeks before the Declaration of Independence of Ukraine was appointed a Deputy Minister of Industrial Privatization and Demonopolization of Ukrainian SSR (the government body later transformed into State Property Fund of Ukraine).

On October 29, 1991 he became a member of the first Cabinet of the independent Ukraine, Fokin government, as the Minister of Labour. Held this office for almost five years, serving in Cabinets of five consecutive Prime Ministers. Resigned in August 1996.

In the late 1990s and early 2000s he had a number of positions in public service, most notably as the Governor of Chernihiv Oblast since May 1998 till August 1999.

He died on June 20, 2004, in Kyiv. A heart attack was reported as the cause of death. He is buried at Baikove Cemetery.

References

External links
 Mykhailo Kaskevych

1948 births
2004 deaths
People from Nizhyn
People's Democratic Party (Ukraine) politicians
Governors of Chernihiv Oblast
Labor ministers of Ukraine
Burials at Baikove Cemetery